The International Physicists' Tournament (IPT) is a physics competition for undergraduate students, bachelors or master level (or equivalent), in which students representing their nation and institution have typically 9 months to solve a set of challenging unsolved physics problems, then present and defend them to other teams. The tournament originated in Ukraine in 2009 between the Ukraine and the Russian Federation, but, it has since grown to encompass numerous countries spanning multiple continents. It was initially inspired by the International Young Physicists' Tournament (IYPT) and follows a similar model. Undergraduates may be accompanied by team leaders, who are usually academic research staff or doctoral research students.

Description
Teams of up to 6 students are provided with a list of 17 problems which require a combination of experimental and theoretical approaches to their solution. The problems often have no exact solution and are not described directly in the scientific literature. Teams may also be accompanied by up to two team leaders (usually academic teachers, researchers or students), as well as supporting guests. A typical round in the tournament sees one team acting as a reporter, another acting as an opponent and a third acting as a reviewer. Under special circumstances a fourth team may also be present, which acts purely as an observer. After each round, the teams change roles and repeat until each team has played each role.  Each of these roles is outlined below.

The Reporter 
The goal of the reporter is to present their solution to the problem challenged by the opponent. The reporter ideally presents a solution that contains both a theoretical and experimental treatment of the chosen problem. The presentation should include an outline which helps the audience to develop a good physical intuition for the problem.

The reporting team must also be able to defend their solution against criticism. This criticism is provided by the other teams and by a panel of judges called 'the jury' during the discussion that follows the reporting team's presentation.

The Opponent 
The opponent's job is to challenge the reporter to present their solution to one of the 17 initial problems. The goal of the opponent is to find the pros and cons of the reporter's solution and to present their critique it in a short review at the end or the reporters presentation. During this critique, the opponent must suggest the topics that will be the focus of subsequent discussion between the reporting and opposing teams.

The Reviewer 
The goal of the reviewer is to give a brief review of the reporter and opponent presentations. They must then discuss and highlight the main ideas that emerged as a result of this discussion while also highlighting any points that the two teams may have overlooked. Although the reviewer can ask questions to the reporter and opponent and take part in the discussion about the problems, their main role is to help the two other teams to reach a consensus and agree on what has been done and what more could be done to solve the problem.

The Observer 
When more than three teams are present, a fourth role is used - that of the observer. The observing team simply watches the round, but cannot participate in any of the discussions.

The Jury 
The jury is made up of a panel of senior academics and members of the IPT international organising committee. Their role is to provide a grade from 1-10 for each team and should be one which reflects each team's performance during the round. The grades are awarded based on a series of guidelines which vary for each role (Reporter, Opponent or Reviewer). However, there is a certain level of subjectivity when it comes to awarding the marks and each jury member is encouraged to use his/her discretion when applying the guidelines.

Organisation 

The tournament is represented by the International Organising Committee (IOC), which comprises representatives from each of the participating countries as well as the executive committee (also shortened to ExeCom). The tournament is continuously managed by an executive committee composed of PhD and academic researchers and teachers from numerous participating countries. The committee is in charge of the likes of; problem selection, year round communication to participants, maintenance of the website and outreach, maintaining and improving the rules and executing the decisions made by the representatives of the countries part of the IPT. On the local level of the tournament, a Local Organising Committee (LOC) from the host institution and the IOC organises the tournament. The ExeCom, and by extension the IPT, is headed by a president voted by the country representatives once every two years. The other required posts include the secretary, treasurer and the vice-president. It is important to note that the ExeCom has no voting power.

National Selections and pre-selection 

Should more than one institution per country an apply, the participating country should organise a national selection process. This is organised by the IOC member representing the country and ideally follows the format of the international competition using a subset of the 17 problems chosen. Often the winner of these national selections will hold the country's spot in the final tournament. Should the number of countries registering for the tournament outweigh the number of places available (currently 21), a pre-selection process will be engaged. This pre-selection - or qualification - requires teams registered to submit a report on one of a subset of the problems. The reports are graded by peer review from various academic research staff and then a rank is drawn to determine which nation's teams will qualify for the final tournament.

During the Tournament 

The tournament is composed of selective fights (usually four) and a final fight. Every team competes in all the selective fights, but only the three (or four) teams with the largest number of marks after the selective fights take part in the final.

Each fight involves three (or four) teams competing against each other in three (or four) rounds. During each round, these teams will act as either Reporter, Opponent or Reviewer (and Observer, if the group contains four teams). The teams then rotate around each of the roles until each team has played each role.

After the Tournament 

Up to a maximum of two weeks following the previous tournament, suggestions for the next edition's problems are open to the public. Once enough suggested problems have been collected, a committee of academic researchers associated with the IPT gather and form a shortlist of problems for members of participating countries to assign up to 100 points per country to problems. The problems are then ranked by points and re-assessed by the committee, before being released to the public.

Editions

Participants
Below is a list, along with country of origin, of the institutions who have and currently are participating in the IPT. This may be either through only the pre-selection or the final tournament. Alongside is also indicated past victories with a ★.
 University of Queensland (Australia)
 Federal University of ABC (Brazil)
 University of Campinas (Brazil)
 Nankai University (China)
 Universidad Nacional de Colombia (Colombia)
 Universidad de los Andes (Colombia)
 Universidad Industrial de Santander (Colombia)
 University of Zagreb (Croatia)
 Technical University of Denmark (Denmark)
 Ecole Normale Supérieure de Lyon★ (France)
 Ecole Normale Superieure Ulm (France)
 Ecole Polytechnique★ (France)
 Goethe University Frankfurt (Germany)
 University of Erlangen–Nuremberg (Germany)
 National and Kapodistrian University of Athens (Greece)
 University of Crete (Greece)
 Shiv Nadar University (India)
 National Institute of Science Education and Research (India)
 Aymi (Iran)
 Politecnico di Milano (Italy)
 University of Milan (Italy)
 University of Bologna (Italy)
 University of Ljubljana (Slovenia)
 Complutense University of Madrid (Spain)
 University of Warsaw (Poland)
 Harvard University (United States of America)
 Dartmouth College (United States of America)
 Columbia University (United States of America)
 University of Nottingham (United Kingdom)
 Lviv Polytechnic (Ukraine)
 Kharkiv National University★(Ukraine)
 Kyiv National University (Ukraine)
 Universidad Simon Bolivar (Venezuela)
 Chalmers University of Technology (Sweden)
 KTH (Sweden)
 Ecole Polytechnique Federale de Lausanne★ (Switzerland)
 Voronezh State University (Russia)
 Moscow Institute of Physics and Technology (Russia)
 Indian Institute of Science Education and Research, Bhopal (India)

History

Original Logo 

The first logo of the International Physicists' Tournament consisted of a collage representing the different fields of physics. The general outline represent electron orbits around a coat of arms. Six symbols placed in the orbit lobs represents (clockwise) Atomic physics, Crystallography, Classical mechanics, Thermodynamics, Electromagnetism and Optics. Two wands crossing over the arm of coats symbolises the confrontation during the Physics Fights. Finally, a ribbon is laid across the logo with the letters IPT imprinted in the middle.

See also 
 International Young Physicists' Tournament

References 

Youth science
Student quiz competitions
Physics competitions
Recurring events established in 2009